The 2003–04 National Division Two was the fourth version (seventeenth overall) of the third division of the English rugby union league system using the name National Division Two.  New teams to the division included Moseley and Rugby Lions who were relegated from the 2002–03 National Division One while promoted teams included Nuneation who came up as champions of the 2002–03 National Division Three North with Rosslyn Park (champions) and Lydney (playoffs) coming up from the 2002–03 National Division Three South.  This season would be the last using the league points system of 2 points for a win and 1 point for a draw.

In what was a very tight title race, Sedgley Park Park pipped Nottingham to the league championship by just one point – with both sides winning promotion to the 2004–05 National Division One.  It was quite a turn around in Nottingham's case as the club had gone from just escaping relegation the previous season to gaining promotion as the league's runner up.  At the other end of the table, promoted Lydney finished bottom with easily the worst record of just two wins and a draw from their twenty-six games.  Joining them in the second relegation spot were Rugby Lions who went down on the last day of the season by losing heavily to champions Sedgley Park whilst relegation rivals Rosslyn Park stayed up by virtue of their win against Newbury Blues.   Lydney would go into the 2004–05 National Division Three South while Rugby Lions dropped to the 2004–05 National Division Three North in what would be the Lions second successive relegation.

Participating teams and locations

Final league table

Results

Round 1

Round 2

Round 3

Round 4

Round 5

Round 6

Round 7

Round 8

Round 9

Round 10

Round 11

Round 12

Round 13

Round 14

Round 15

Round 16

Round 17

Round 18 

Postponed.  Game rescheduled to 21 February 2004.

Round 19

Round 20

Round 18 (rescheduled game) 

Game rescheduled from 31 January 2004.

Round 21 

Postponed.  Game rescheduled to 5 March 2004.

Postponed.  Game rescheduled to 6 March 2004.

Round 21 (rescheduled games) 

Game rescheduled from 28 February 2004.

Game rescheduled from 28 February 2004.

Round 22

Round 23 

Postponed.  Game rescheduled to 27 March 2004.

Round 23 (rescheduled game) 

Game rescheduled from 20 March 2004.

Round 24

Round 25

Round 26

Total season attendances

Individual statistics 

 Note that points scorers includes tries as well as conversions, penalties and drop goals.

Top points scorers

Top try scorers

Season records

Team
Largest home win — 91 pts
91 - 0 Nuneaton at home to Lydney on 24 January 2004
Largest away win — 43 pts
58 - 15 Nottingham away to Lydney on 20 December 2003
Most points scored — 91 pts
91 - 0 Nuneaton at home to Lydney on 24 January 2004
Most tries in a match — 15
Nuneaton at home to Lydney on 24 January 2004
Most conversions in a match — 8
Nuneaton at home to Lydney on 24 January 2004
Most penalties in a match — 8
Stourbridge at home to Rosslyn Park on 25 October 2003
Most drop goals in a match — 2 
Bracknell away to Sedgley Park on 29 November 2003

Player
Most points in a match — 32
 Sam Howard for Rosslyn Park at home to Bracknell on 3 January 2004
Most tries in a match — 5
 John Carter for Doncaster at home to Lydney on 7 February 2004
Most conversions in a match — 8
 Peter Glackin for Nuneaton at home to Lydney on 24 January 2004
Most penalties in a match —  8
 Ben Harvey for Stourbridge at home to Rosslyn Park on 25 October 2003
Most drop goals in a match —  2 
 Neil Hallett for Bracknell away to Sedgley Park on 29 November 2003

Attendances
Highest — 1,495  
Nottingham at home to Lydney on 10 April 2004
Lowest — 150 
Bracknell at home to Rugby Lions on 6 September 2003
Highest Average Attendance — 798
Nottingham
Lowest Average Attendance — 150	
Bracknell

See also
 English Rugby Union Leagues
 English rugby union system
 Rugby union in England

References

External links
 NCA Rugby

National
National League 1 seasons